My Name is Sara (also known as The Occupation) is a 2019 American biographical drama film directed by Steven Oritt, starring Zuzanna Surowy,  and Michalina Olszańska. It is based on the life of holocaust survivor Sara Góralnik.

Cast
 Zuzanna Surowy as Sara
  as Pavlo
 Michalina Olszańska as Nadya
  as Avram
  as Tsivia
  as Vira Ivanenko
  as Ivan
 Konrad Cichon as Moishe
  as Grisha
 Artur Sokolski as Danylo
 Marcin Sokolski as Stepan
  as Pavlo's mother
 Stanislaw Cywka as Boris
  as Marina
  as Fedir Ivanenko
 Radosław Kaim as German Soldier
  as Father Oleksa
  as SS Officer
  as Captain
 Ryszard Ronczewski as Pavlo's Father

Release
The film premiered at the Giffoni Film Festival on 21 July 2019.

Reception
Matt Zoller Seitz of RogerEbert.com rated the film 3.5 stars out of 4 and called it a "torment in cinematic form, made engrossing by its focus on a singular experience, and the performance that anchors it", writing that Surowy "has that gift of letting the surroundings and events absorb and reflect her."

Gary Goldstein of the Los Angeles Times wrote that the film "has its share of physically and emotionally tough moments", and called Surowy's performance "gripping, deeply textured and sympathetic".

Ben Kenigsberg of The New York Times called the film "intermittently powerful if somewhat stiff-jointed" and wrote that it can be "clunkily expository" and "frustratingly vague."

References

External links
 
 

American biographical drama films
2019 biographical drama films